The 1956 World Table Tennis Championships – Corbillon Cup (women's team) was the 16th edition of the women's team championship. 

Romania won the gold medal with a perfect 7–0 match record, England won the silver medal and Japan won the bronze medal.

Medalists

Final table

Decisive Group Match

See also
List of World Table Tennis Championships medalists

References

-
1956 in women's table tennis